Richmond Heights is a St. Louis MetroLink station. It is located near the interchange of Interstate 170 and Galleria Parkway in Richmond Heights, Missouri and serves the popular Saint Louis Galleria shopping mall, The Boulevard mixed-use development, the University Club Tower, and neighboring residential areas.

The station has a small commuter parking lot with 57 spaces and includes a kiss-and-ride turnaround.

In 2009, Metro's Arts in Transit program commissioned the work Mime by Kristin Jones and Andrew Ginzel for installation at this station. A collar of stainless steel convex mirrors absorbs and reflects everything seen in the station environs.

Station layout

References

External links 
 St. Louis Metro

MetroLink stations in St. Louis County, Missouri
Railway stations in the United States opened in 2006
Blue Line (St. Louis MetroLink)